Axel Bóasson (born 3 June 1990) is an Icelandic professional golfer. In 2017, he became Iceland's first winner on the Nordic Golf League and won the Nordic Golf League Order of Merit. He also won the mixed team gold and the men's silver at the 2018 European Golf Team Championships at Gleneagles, Scotland.

Early life and amateur career
Bóasson was born in Reykjavík. He won the Icelandic Championship in 2011 and represented Iceland at the 2011 European Amateur Team Championship and the 2012 Eisenhower Trophy. 

In 2015, he won both the Icelandic Match Play Championship and the Icelandic Stroke Play Championship.

Bóasson attended Mississippi State University between 2010 and 2014 and played with the Mississippi State Bulldogs golf team in the Southeastern Conference.

Professional career
Bóasson turned professional in 2016 and joined the Nordic Golf League. He became the first ever Icelandic winner of the Nordic Golf League in 2017 when he won the SM Match in Sweden. He also won the 12 Twelve Championship in Denmark and finished inside the top ten on nine further occasions over 20 starts, to become the Nordic Golf League Order of Merit winner, and was promoted to the Challenge Tour.

Bóasson represented Iceland at the 2018 European Golf Team Championships at Gleneagles, Scotland. He won the team gold together with Ólafía Þórunn Kristinsdóttir, Valdis Thora Jonsdottir and Birgir Hafþórsson, and silver behind Spain in the men's event with Hafþórsson.

Amateur wins
2011 Icelandic Championship
2015 Eimskipsmotarodin 4 - Icelandic Match Play Championship, Eimskipsmotarodin 5 - Icelandic Stroke Play Championship

Source:

Professional wins (3)

Nordic Golf League wins (3)

Team appearances
Amateur
European Boys' Team Championship (representing Iceland): 2006, 2008
European Amateur Team Championship (representing Iceland): 2009, 2010, 2011
Eisenhower Trophy (representing Iceland): 2012

Professional
European Championships (representing Iceland): 2018 (winner – mixed team)

References

External links
 
 

Icelandic male golfers
Mississippi State Bulldogs golfers
Sportspeople from Reykjavík
1990 births
Living people